TAN-67 (SB-205,607) is an opioid drug used in scientific research that acts as a potent and selective δ-opioid agonist, selective for the δ1 subtype. It has analgesic properties and induces dopamine release in nucleus accumbens. It also protects both heart and brain tissue from hypoxic tissue damage through multiple mechanisms involving among others an interaction between δ receptors and mitochondrial K(ATP) channels.

References 

Opioids
Delta-opioid receptor agonists
Phenols